Christopher Ventris, born 1965, in London, is a British  tenor. He is particularly known for his role as Parsifal which he has performed over 100 times including performances at the Bayreuth Festival during the 2008, 2009, and 2010 Festival seasons.

Ventris studied at the Royal Academy of Music, studying with Joy Mammen. He appeared there in the title-role of Orpheus in the Underworld, where one critic, though commenting that "North-country speech and standard pronunciation in song do not go well together in operetta", otherwise found "Ventris was a true-voiced and likeable Orpheus".

After college he joined Glyndebourne Festival Opera winning the GTO Singers and John Christie awards. He went on to sing with other British companies, including Opera North  and English National Opera. He sang the part of Robert Lonle in the first performance of Robert Saxton's Caritas and the combined role of Walter, Hugo and the old woman in the first performance of Judith Weir's opera Blond Eckbert. He was the 2007 recipient of the Maria Callas Debut Artist of the Year Award, presented annually by Dallas Opera to the singer who makes the biggest impact on voting patrons in his or her company debut, for the role of Lohengrin.

Ventris' engagements include productions at the Vienna State Opera, the San Francisco Opera, the Royal Opera, London, the Teatro di San Carlo, Naples, La Fenice, Venice, La Scala, Milan, the Glyndebourne Festival, the Grand Théâtre de Genève in Geneva and the Bavarian State Opera.

Roles 
Ventris's roles include:
The title roles in Parsifal, Lohengrin, Tannhäuser and Peter Grimes
Siegmund in Die Walküre
Erik in Der fliegende Holländer
Max in Der Freischütz
Sergej in Lady Macbeth of Mtsensk
Laca in Jenůfa
Janek in The Makropulos Affair
Florestan in Fidelio
Manolios in The Greek Passion
Lensky in Eugene Onegin
Grigory (the False Dmitriy) in Boris Godunov
Jenik in The Bartered Bride
Prince in The Love of Three Oranges
Jack in The Midsummer Marriage
Paris in King Priam
Clemente in Hans Werner Henze's Venus und Adonis
Officer in Cardillac

Selected recordings 
Wagner: Parsifal (Christopher Ventris, Thomas Hampson, Waltraud Meier, Matti Salminen; Berlin Opera Orchestra and Chorus, conductor: Kent Nagano. (DVD - 2005) Label: BBC / Opus Arte'
Shostakovich: Lady Macbeth of Mtsensk (Christopher Ventris, Eva-Maria Westbroek, Vladimir Vaneev, Carole Wilson, Ludovit Ludha; Royal Concertgebouw Orchestra, conductor: Mariss Jansons (DVD 2006) Label: BBC / Opus Arte.
Britten: Peter Grimes (Christopher Ventris, Emily Magee, Liliana Nikiteanu, Alfred Muff; Zurich Opera Orchestra and Chorus, conductor: Franz Welser-Möst (DVD 2007) Label: EMI.

References 

Joshua Kosman, Reimagining `Parsifal', San Francisco Chronicle, June 20, 2000
Cheryl North Interviews Christopher Ventris, ANG Newspapers, June 30, 2000
Artist biographies in programme to 1994 ENO production of Blond Eckbert

English operatic tenors
Heldentenors
21st-century British male opera singers
Living people
Singers from London
1965 births
20th-century British male opera singers